Amapola is a 2014 Argentine-American romantic comedy fantasy film written and directed by Eugenio Zanetti and starring Camilla Belle, François Arnaud, Lito Cruz, Leonor Benedetto and Geraldine Chaplin. It is the first film as a director of Zanetti, who was previously known for his work in art direction, as well as set designer and theater/opera director.

Synopsis 
During the turbulent years that changed Argentina - between 1966's Coup d'état and its subsequent dictatorship, the Malvinas/Falklands War in 1982 and the return to democracy in 1983 - a young woman who lives with a family of artists is magically transported to the future, where she discovers the decadence that fell upon her family, their estate and herself. She decides to return to her present in an effort to change the future, keep her family united, save her happiness and find her true love.

Cast 
 Camilla Belle as Amapola
 François Arnaud as Luke 
 Geraldine Chaplin as Memé
 Lito Cruz as Amapola's father
 Leonor Benedetto as Clara
 Esmeralda Mitre as Sisy
 Elena Roger 
 Nicolás Pauls as Ariel
 Luciano Cáceres as Tincho
 Nicolás Scarpino as Lalo
 Liz Solari as Lola
 Juan Luppi as Juan
 Santiago Caamaño as Gáston
 Juan Acosta as Saporitti

Production 
Amapola was for a long time a dream project for Argentine Eugenio Zanetti, who gained international recognition for his work in many Hollywood films such as Flatliners (1990), Last Action Hero (1993), What Dreams May Come (1998) and The Haunting (1999), and won an Academy Award for Best Art Direction in 1995 for the film Restoration. Zanetti also participated as the film's production designer.

Camilla Belle took some time before filming for learning to speak Castilian, a variant of the Spanish language and Argentina's official language (as well as the most popularly talked in the country), and to do so with a "Porteño" (people from Buenos Aires City) accent.

Reception 
Released in Argentina on June 5, 2014, the film received mixed reviews from Argentinian critics.

See also 
 Time travel in fiction

References

External links 
 
 

2014 films
2014 romantic comedy films
20th Century Fox films
2010s Spanish-language films
Films about time travel
Films set in Argentina
Films set in Buenos Aires
Films shot in Argentina
Films about Latin American military dictatorships
Comedy films based on actual events
Films shot in Buenos Aires
2014 multilingual films
American multilingual films
Argentine multilingual films
English-language Argentine films
2010s English-language films